Willem Gustaaf van Maanen (30 September 1920 – 17 August 2012) was a Dutch journalist and writer. He received the Ferdinand Bordewijk Prijs in 1983 for Het nichtje van Mozart and was the 2004 recipient of the Constantijn Huygens Prize. He was born in Kampen.

References
Profile at the Digital library for Dutch literature
Willem G. van Maanen's obituary 

1920 births
2012 deaths
Dutch male novelists
Dutch journalists
People from Kampen, Overijssel
Constantijn Huygens Prize winners
Ferdinand Bordewijk Prize winners
20th-century Dutch novelists
20th-century Dutch male writers